Buena Vista Alta District is one of four districts of the province Casma in Peru.

References

Districts of the Casma Province
Districts of the Ancash Region